Kings Valley Charter School is a K-12 public charter school located one mile outside of Kings Valley, Oregon, United States.

Demographics
Enrollment in the 2012–2013 school year was 179.

History
The school opened in 1848, and after 153 years of operation, it was closed in 2001 by the Philomath School District. After being closed for one year, it was reopened as a K-5 charter school. As of the 2011–12 school year, it had expanded into a K-12 school.

In 2016 King Valley Charter School asked the Philomath School District (PSD) to increase the number of students in the school, which PSD granted.

Lawsuit
In July 2012, Kings Valley Charter School sued the Philomath School District for withholding money set aside for rural funding. PSD then countered by claiming that Kings Valley Charter School violated its charter for contracting its employees through an outside group called People Sustaining Kings Valley (PSKV); this was done to avoid paying pensions into the public employees' retirement system.

References

External links
 

Charter schools in Oregon
High schools in Benton County, Oregon
Public elementary schools in Oregon
Public middle schools in Oregon
Public high schools in Oregon
2001 establishments in Oregon
Educational institutions established in 2001